John Francis O'Connell (20 January 1927 – 8 March 2013) was an Irish Labour Party, Independent and Fianna Fáil politician who served as Minister for Health from 1992 to 1993 and Ceann Comhairle of Dáil Éireann from 1981 to 1982. He served as a Teachta Dála (TD) from 1965 to 1987 and from 1989 to 1993. He served as a Member of the European Parliament (MEP) for the Dublin constituency from 1979 to 1981. He was a Senator from 1987 to 1989, after being nominated by the Taoiseach.

Early life
O'Connell was born in a tenement at Aungier Street, Dublin, and educated at St. Vincent's C.B.S. in Glasnevin and the Royal College of Surgeons, Dublin. In 1960 he founded MIMS Ireland, a monthly index of medical specialties, and in 1967 he founded the Irish Medical Times, a weekly broadsheet for doctors.

Political career
He began his political career when he was elected to Dáil Éireann as a Labour Party TD for Dublin South-West at the 1965 general election. He held a seat for the party in the constituency until a revision of constituencies in 1977, when he was elected for Dublin Ballyfermot. At the  first direct elections in 1979 to the European Parliament, he was elected with his running mate Michael O'Leary to the Dublin constituency.

There was a further revision of constituencies at the 1981 general election. He failed to be selected as a Labour Party candidate for Dublin South-Central with party leader Frank Cluskey. O'Connell was encouraged to stand in Dublin West, but refused. He contested Dublin South-Central as an Independent candidate, topping the poll, while Cluskey lost his seat.

When the 22nd Dáil met in June 1981, O'Connell was elected as Ceann Comhairle of Dáil Éireann. He resigned from the European Parliament. In March 1982, at the beginning of the 23rd Dáil, he was elected to the position again. However, in December 1982, when the 24th Dáil met, his nomination to the position was unsuccessful, being defeated by Fine Gael TD Tom Fitzpatrick. As outgoing Ceann Comhairle, O'Connell was returned automatically in the two elections of 1982.

He remained an Independent TD until February 1985, when he joined Fianna Fáil. He lost his Dáil seat at the 1987 general election. That year he was one of those nominated by the Taoiseach Charles Haughey to the 18th Seanad, serving until he regained his Dáil seat at the 1989 general election.

Following Albert Reynolds' resignation from cabinet, O'Connell supported him and is seen as one of those who helped persuade Haughey to resign when he did. O'Connell was appointed Minister for Health by Reynolds in 1992. He remained as Minister for Health until 1993, when owing to ill-health, he retired from cabinet and then resigned from the Dáil.

Further controversy surrounded O'Connell's relationship with Charles Haughey in later years. It was revealed during the Moriarty Tribunal firstly that O'Connell was the middleman for donations from Arab tycoon Mahmoud Fustok to Haughey; and secondly that O'Connell had invested a significant sum in Celtic Helicopters, a business venture owned by Haughey's son Ciarán.

In the 1970s he arranged a meeting in his home between Harold Wilson MP, then leader of the British Labour Party, and Dáithí Ó Conaill, a member of the Provisional IRA Army Council. Negotiations that night to broker a ceasefire were successful in the short term, but ultimately broke down.

In 1988 he published a memoir, Doctor John: crusading doctor and politician.

References

External links

1927 births
2013 deaths
Labour Party (Ireland) TDs
Independent TDs
Fianna Fáil TDs
Members of the 18th Seanad
Members of the 18th Dáil
Members of the 19th Dáil
Members of the 20th Dáil
Members of the 21st Dáil
Members of the 22nd Dáil
Members of the 23rd Dáil
Members of the 24th Dáil
Members of the 26th Dáil
Members of the 27th Dáil
Politicians from Dublin (city)
Alumni of the Royal College of Surgeons in Ireland
20th-century Irish medical doctors
Presiding officers of Dáil Éireann
Labour Party (Ireland) MEPs
MEPs for the Republic of Ireland 1979–1984
Ministers for Health (Ireland)
Nominated members of Seanad Éireann
Fianna Fáil senators
People from Glasnevin
Medical doctors from Dublin (city)